Roade is a village in Northamptonshire, England. Currently in West Northamptonshire, before local government changes in 2021 it was represented by South Northamptonshire District Council, falling within the two-member Blisworth and Roade ward.

Roade village has a long medieval history dating as far back as 1066 

The village's name means 'clearing'.

Location
The road bisects the village into the eastern, older part, and the western part, which is mostly 20th-century housing.

Demographics
The 2001 Census shows 2,254 people living in the parish, 1,117 male and 1,137 female, in 962 dwellings. In 2011 the population had increased to 2,312.

West Coast Main Line

Four tracks of the West Coast Main Line from London Euston to Manchester and Scotland go through the village in a deep cutting. The cutting bisects the village into the older part on the east side and the more recent west side. However, there are two main road bridges and four others for pedestrians, some for minor traffic and farm vehicles. The line dates from 1838 and was electrified in the 1960s.

The cutting is a geological Site of Special Scientific Interest (SSSI) listed by English Nature.

Roade railway station was situated at the southern end of the village and the cutting, but closed in 1964. There was a campaign in the 1990s to have the station re-opened for commuter traffic to London, Milton Keynes and Northampton, but there are no current plans to do so.

1969 rail accident
An accident occurred at the northern end of the cutting, at the junction, on 31 December 1969 when a northbound goods train on the slow lines derailed. A southbound passenger train from Northampton was passing at the time at about 75 mph and collided with the derailed wagons and was partly derailed itself. The driver of the passenger train was killed. The cause of the derailment was the failure of a main bearing spring on an empty 16-ton mineral wagon, and very similar to a previous incident on the Northampton loop in 1967.

Rail Freight Terminal, A508 western bypass road
In January 2021, work began on a rail freight terminal at Roade, taking advantage of its connection to the railway and proximity to the M1. The facility is anticipated to become fully operational by the end of 2023. "Work about to get underway includes incorporating major upgrades to Junctions 15 and 15a on the M1, a new bridge over the West Coast Mainline, the construction of a[n A508] bypass around Roade and improvements to the A45 and safer junctions along the A508".

Facilities
The local secondary school, Elizabeth Woodville School is the one of two Sports Colleges in Northamptonshire, the other being Kingsthorpe College. The school is on the A508 Stratford road at the south-west end of the village and has around 1,150 pupils. The catchment area extends to Grange Park, Blisworth, Stoke Bruerne and several other villages in the area. The school opened in 1956 as Roade Secondary Modern School changing to a Comprehensive School in 1975. The School merged with Kingsbrook Business and Enterprise school in Deanshanger in September 2011. The merged school was renamed Elizabeth Woodville School. Woodville was born in Grafton Regis which is halfway between the two schools and was Queen consort of King Edward IV.

Roade Primary School in Hartwell Road has about 166 pupils and the original school was built in 1876.

There is a main post office in the High Street offering most services including the payment of Vehicle Excise Duty.

The village pub is The Cock Inn, at the junction of the High Street with Hartwell Road.

The village has its own football team who play in the Premier Division of the Northamptonshire Combination Football League, known as Roade FC.

Famous people from the village
 Glenys Kinnock, Labour Party politician.
 Bernard Donoughue, Labour Party politician.
 David Capel, cricketer

Freedom of the Parish
The following people and military units have received the Freedom of the Parish of Roade.

Individuals
 Shamsher "Sam" Chatur: 19 November 2022.
 Nilufa "Lucy" Chatur: 19 November 2022.

References

External links

 Roade parish council web site
 Roade football club website
 Roade History Society

Villages in Northamptonshire
West Northamptonshire District
Civil parishes in Northamptonshire